This is a list of members of the Parliament of Tuvalu or Palamene o Tuvalu who were elected at the 2015 Tuvaluan general election or as the result of by-elections during the life of the parliament.

The general election was held in Tuvalu on 31 March 2015. The state of emergency created by Cyclone Pam resulted in the election being delayed twice. The election was originally schedule for 19 March, then after Cyclone Pam caused damage to the islands, the election was rescheduled.

The constituencies of Niutao and Nui had contested ballots, including former members of parliament as candidates. On Nui the sitting members were not returned to parliament. On Nuitao Vete Sakaio, the deputy-prime minister, was not elected; the election was otherwise a good result for the government of Enele Sopoaga, who expects to have the support of 11 members of parliament. Enele Sopoaga was sworn in as prime minister and appointed the ministers to the cabinet on 10 April.

Members elected for the first time at the 2015 general election are noted with *

Vaitupu by-election, 2017
Apisai Ielemia was elected to represent Vaitupu in the Tuvaluan general election, 2015. On 5 October 2016 Chief Justice Sweeney of the High Court of Tuvalu declared that Ielemia's parliamentary seat was vacant as he was no longer qualified to be a member of parliament, as the consequence of the short time the opposition MP served time in jail following his conviction on 6 May 2016 in the Magistrate's Court of charges of abuse of office during the final year of his term as Prime Minister (August 2006 to September 2010).

The Vaitupu by-election was held on 17 July 2017. Isaia Vaipuna Taape was elected with about half the 1,100 votes, 41 votes ahead of Melton Paka Tauetia. Taape was sworn in as a member of parliament for Vaitupu on Wednesday 16 August 2017.

Funafuti by-election, 2018
Sir Kamuta Latasi resigned as MP on 17 October 2018. A by-election was held on 20 November 2018, with Simon Kofe, a former senior magistrate, being elected.

References

Tuvalu politics-related lists